Fernando Clavijo Batlle (born 10 August 1971 in San Cristóbal de La Laguna, Tenerife, Spain) is a Spanish politician. A member of the Canarian Coalition, he was the former president of the autonomous community of the Canary Islands from 2015 to 2019.

References

1971 births
Canarian Coalition politicians
Living people
Members of the 9th Parliament of the Canary Islands
Members of the 10th Parliament of the Canary Islands
Members of the 14th Senate of Spain
People from San Cristóbal de La Laguna
Presidents of the Canary Islands